Cnemaspis upendrai is a species of diurnal gecko endemic to island of Sri Lanka. The specific name honours Siran Upendra Deraniyagala, a Sri Lankan prehistorian.

Dorsum is light-brown with prominent markings, but some individuals are uniformly yellowish brown, without prominent dorsal markings.

References

upendrai
Endemic fauna of Sri Lanka
Reptiles of Sri Lanka
Reptiles described in 2007